Events from the year 1975 in Denmark.

Incumbents
 Monarch – Margrethe II
 Prime minister – Poul Hartling (until February 13), Anker Jørgensen

Events
9 January – The 1975 Danish parliamentary election is held.

Sports
 September 6 – Ole Olsen wins the 1975 Individual Speedway World Championship at Wembley Stadium in London.

Births
 17 January – Nicolai Frahm, art advisor 
 18 February – Simon Kvamm, actor and singer
 24 May – Sofie Carsten Nielsen, politician
 6 July – Anders Matthesen, stand-up comedian, actor and rapper

Deaths

See also
1975 in Danish television

References

 
Denmark
Years of the 20th century in Denmark
1970s in Denmark